Jacob Joseph (born 9 July 1958) is a Malaysian football coach.

His coaching experiences include stints as head coach of Malaysia women's national football team, ATM FA, Perak Jenderata, UPB-MyTeam FC as youth coach, Muar Municipal Council FC, and MISC-MIFA.

Honours
MISC-MIFA
 Malaysia FAM League: 2016

References

1958 births
Living people
Malaysian football managers
Malaysian people of Indian descent
Women's national association football team managers